John 10 is the tenth chapter of the Gospel of John in the New Testament of the Christian Bible. The author of the book containing this chapter is anonymous, but early Christian tradition uniformly affirmed that John composed this Gospel. This chapter records Jesus' description of himself as the "door of the sheep" and the "Good Shepherd", and contains the only mention of Hanukkah, "the Feast of Dedication", in the New Testament.

Text 

The original text was written in Koine Greek. This chapter is divided into 42 verses.

Textual witnesses
Some early manuscripts containing the text of this chapter are: 
Papyrus 75 (AD 175–225)
Papyrus 66 (~ 200)
Codex Vaticanus (325-350)
Papyrus 6 (~ 350; extant: Greek verses 1–2, 4–7, 9–10; Coptic verses 1–12, 20)
Codex Sinaiticus (330-360)
Codex Bezae (~ 400)
Codex Alexandrinus (400-440)

Old Testament references
 : Psalm

Places
Events recorded in this chapter refer to the following locations:
 Jerusalem
 The east bank of Jordan River, the place where John the Baptist was baptizing at first.

The true shepherd illustration
In verses , Jesus uses a parable, illustration or "figure of speech" regarding the manner in which a true shepherd enters his sheepfold, through the door or the gate, unlike the manner of a thief or a stranger. H. W. Watkins notes that "the word rendered 'parable' is the wider word (paroimia) which includes every kind of figurative and proverbial teaching, every kind of speech ... which departs from the usual course (oimos)". The word παραβολα (parabola) is not used in John's Gospel. The narrative is introduced "very truly" or "most assuredly". Jesus' audience ("they", verse 6) did not understand.

In this illustration, the true shepherd "enters the sheepfold by the door" and "calls his own sheep by name and leads them out". The alternative way in, taken by the thief or stranger, is to "climb up some other way", i.e. to climb over the wall of the sheepfold. 

In its reference to the shepherd leading the flock out of the sheepfold, verse 3 has the only occurrence of the word ἐξάγει (exagei) in the New Testament, Heinrich Meyer and Alford both connect this pericope with John 9:35-41.

The Ethiopic version adds "and loves them" to verse 3.

The door of the sheep and the good shepherd
In verse 7, the Textus Receptus adds that Jesus said to them but this addition is generally agreed to be "of doubtful authority".

The Feast of Dedication
Verse 22 refers to Hanukkah:
Now it was the Feast of Dedication in Jerusalem, and it was winter. 
The feast (ta egkainia) recalls the Maccabean purification and re-dedication of the Temple, . During the intervening two months, there is no account of whether Jesus remained in Jerusalem or not. In  we read that Jesus "went away again beyond the Jordan", and German Protestant theologian Heinrich Meyer identifies a number of commentators who have suggested that there was an additional "journey to Galilee or Peraea" before the feast of dedication, although Meyer himself considers that these suggestions are "dictated by harmonistic presuppositions and clumsy combinations, ... and not by the requirements of exegesis".

Jesus walked in the temple, in Solomon’s porch or colonnade, a gathering place used by the early church (see  and ) located on the eastern side of the temple.

The believers beyond the Jordan
The chapter ends with Jesus evading Jewish attempts to stone him and then leaving Jerusalem and traveling "beyond the Jordan to the place where John was baptizing at first" (Perea).  and  similarly record that Jesus traveled "to the region of Judea by the other side of the Jordan", but in the synoptic tradition He had previously been in Capernaum rather than Jerusalem. Perea was a region where many people "came to the decision that He was the Messiah" ( in the Living Bible translation).

See also
 Hanukkah
 Jerusalem
 Jesus Christ
 John the Baptist
 Jordan River
 Solomon's Porch
 Related Bible parts: Psalm 23, Psalm 82, Ezekiel 34

References

External links
 King James Bible - Wikisource

 (ESV, KJV, Darby, American Standard Version, Bible in Basic English)
 (NKJV, NIV, NRSV etc.)

John 10